Gualala may refer to:

In North America
Gualala, California, an unincorporated community 105 miles north of San Francisco
Gualala River, a  river that has its mouth near Gualala, California
Gualala Point Regional Park, a regional park at the mouth of the Gualala River

In Central America
Gualala, Honduras, a municipality
Atlético Gualala, a football club